Ian McKissick (born August 20, 1980) is an American former professional road cyclist.

Major results
2007
 1st Stage 2 (TTT) Giro della Friuli Venezia Giulia
2008
 1st Stage 2a Tour de Nez

References

External links

1980 births
Living people
American male cyclists